Nobob is an unincorporated community in  Barren County, Kentucky, United States.

History
A post office called Nobob was established in 1854, and remained in operation until it was discontinued in 1936. The community took its name from nearby Nobob Creek.

References

Unincorporated communities in Barren County, Kentucky
Unincorporated communities in Kentucky